Ion Dragan (born 14 June 1996) is a Moldovan footballer who plays as a midfielder for Milsami Orhei.

International career
On 31 March 2021, Dragan made his international debut for Moldova in a 2022 FIFA World Cup qualification match against Israel.

References

External links
 

1996 births
Living people
Moldovan footballers
Association football forwards
Speranța Nisporeni players
FC Milsami Orhei players
Moldova under-21 international footballers
Moldova international footballers
Moldovan Super Liga players
Real Succes Chișinău players